Salsein is a commune in the Ariège department in the Pyrenees, in southwestern France.

It is located close to Castillon-en-Couserans, about 17 km south-west of Saint-Girons. It is part of the Ariège Pyrenees regional natural park.

The terrain is mountainous. The Bach, Cazalus and Coudères streams run through Salsein.

Population
Inhabitants of Salsein are called Salseinois.

See also
Communes of the Ariège department

References

Communes of Ariège (department)
Ariège communes articles needing translation from French Wikipedia